Michael C. A. Macdonald FBA is a research associate of the Khalili Research Centre, honorary fellow of Wolfson College, University of Oxford, and fellow of the British Academy. He is a Trustee of the International Association for the Study of Arabia. He is a specialist in the languages, scripts and inscriptions of ancient Syria, Jordan and Arabia.

Selected publications
 A.F.L. Beeston at the Arabian Seminar, and other papers. Edited by M.C.A. Macdonald & C.S. Phillips, Oxford: Archaeopress. 2005.
 Literacy and Identity in Pre-Islamic Arabia. (Variorum Collected Studies, 906.) Farnham: Ashgate, 2009.
 The development of Arabic as a written language. Papers from the Special Session of the Seminar for Arabian Studies held on 24 July 2009. Edited by M.C.A. Macdonald. (Supplement to the Proceedings of the Seminar for Arabian Studies volume, 40). Oxford: Archaeopress, 2010.

References

Fellows of the British Academy
Fellows of Wolfson College, Oxford
British philologists
Year of birth missing (living people)
Living people